is a port city in Miyazaki Prefecture, Japan. The city was founded on April 1, 1951, with the joint merger of Tomishima Town and Iwawaki Village. , the city has an estimated population of 60,037 making it the 4th largest city in Miyazaki Prefecture. It has a population density of 178 persons per km2 and a total area of 336.94 km2.

On February 25, 2006, the town of Tōgō (from Higashiusuki District) was merged into Hyūga.

Hyūga is a port city known for the production of Go stones and for beaches, many of which are popular surfing spots

History
Archaeologists working in Hyūga have reported finding artifacts such as stone tools and stone piles from as much as 30,000 years ago, the Japanese Paleolithic period. There is also evidence of inhabitation during the Jōmon period. Archaeological digs uncovering pottery from this time period continue today in parts of the city.

Origin of name
According to Japanese legend in the Nihon Shoki, following the conquest of the Kumaso people, Emperor Keikō watched the sunrise over the ocean and said . From that time, the province was known as Hyuga or Hinata (the country facing the sun) until the Meiji Restoration when it was renamed Miyazaki.

Municipal consolidation
Modern Hyuga City is a result of the merger of numerous smaller towns and villages. These mergers began at the start of the Meiji Period when the han system was abolished and the concept of towns and cities arose. This time period, between 1888 and 1889, became known as the Great Meiji Consolidation. Following this, towns continued to merge mainly due to population limitations or financial limitations. The most recent merger in 2006 with Togo was part of the Great Heisei Consolidation. This was a government initiative to counter population declines and financial problems while promoting decentralization of the national government. This merger increased Hyuga City's population, tax money, and autonomy.

Geography
Hyūga is mainly centered on Hyūgashi Station. The greater Hyūga area is 336.29 km2, much larger than the city limits as a result of mergers with other smaller towns such as Togo and Mimitsu. Hyūga City is a small port city located in Miyazaki Prefecture, just south of Nobeoka. The city itself is located on flatlands between the Kyushu Mountains and the Hyūga Sea. The area along Cape Hyūga with its exposed hexagonal pillar rocks and ria (saw tooth) coastline are designated as part of the Nippo-Kaigan Quasi-National Park. A bit south are beaches such as Ise-ga-hama, Okura-ga-hama, and Kane-ga-hama, known for their surfing.

Climate
Hyūga is located in the humid subtropical climate zone (Köppen climate classification: Cfa), exhibiting four distinct seasons. It has a mild, but humid subtropical climate with no dry season. The climate is comparable to the southern coastal areas of the United States or southern Europe. The average summer daytime temperature is about 30 °C (86 °F) with 80% humidity. The average winter daytime temperature is about 13 °C (56 °F) with 60% humidity. Early summer is marked with the rainy season in June and July. This is followed by a hot, humid summer and daily sunshine, but is often accompanied by typhoons. Winter is mild with small amounts of rain.

Districts
 
 is Hyūga's downtown area. Hyūga City has been engaged in large scale urban renewal, slowly widening roads, creating new businesses, beautifying, and modernizing the city center. As such, Shinmachi is relatively new and modern. This region is centered on Hyūgashi Station.

 
The southern part of Hososhima is centered on Hyūga's commercial fishing port between Komenoyama and Makishimayama. This is an older less frequented part of Hyūga. The streets are narrow and there are numerous old Edo-period buildings.
 
The northern part of Hososhima is far more industrial. This region has several manufacturing plants and large areas for storage of goods and raw materials. Hososhima Industrial Port currently serves as the main international port in northern Miyazaki Prefecture handling materials and goods import and export in the region. Hososhima Industrial Port is designated as a Special Major Port and was selected as a focus port by the Japanese government in 2010. There continues to be major development and expansion of the port and its available services. Hososhima Port was selected by the Japanese government as Port of the Year 2015.

 
Mimitsu was a port town to the south of Hyūga which merged in 1955. It is famous for washi paper and fishing. It is also supposedly the port from which the first Japanese Emperor, Jimmu, launched his military expedition to conquer Yamato and establish it as the center of power.

In the 19th century, it was a prosperous commercial port that was a hub for trade with the cities of Kyoto, Osaka, and Kobe, with so many houses belonging to merchants and shipping agents crowded together that people used to refer to the thousand houses of Mimitsu (Mimitsu-sengen). It fell into sharp decline with the advent of railroads. In 1986, it was designated as a national important preservation district for groups of historic buildings, and much of the 19th-century atmosphere, including traditional buildings, earthen walls, and stone pavements, remains.

 
Tōgō was a small mountain town which merged with Hyūga on February 25, 2006. Togo was the home town of the Japanese writer Bokusui Wakayama.

Neighboring cities and towns
Kadogawa to the north
Misato to the west
Tsuno to the south
Kijō to the southwest

Demographics
, Hyūga had a total population of 63,011 people; 30,150 males and 32,861 females.

Culture

Annual cultural events 
  takes place the first Friday and Saturday of August every year. This is the largest festival in Hyuga City attracting visitors from all over Japan. The rather peculiar dance associated with this festival is not exclusive to Hyuga City, but this is the most famous Hyottoko dance in Japan; as such it and the characters in the dance have become symbols of the city.
  takes place during September or October in accordance to the harvest moon. In Hyuga City, this event features two dances, the more traditional Jugoya dance and a traditional dance specific to the Togo region. This is the second largest festival in Hyuga City.

Museums and other points of interest

Transportation

Rail

Hyūga is served by the Nippō Main Line, a line run by JR Kyushu which serves eastern and southern Kyushu. This provides access to other parts of Miyazaki Prefecture, and other areas of Kyushu as far as Kagoshima and Fukuoka.
Stations on the Nippo Main Line include Hyūgashi Station, Zaikōji Station, Minami-Hyūga Station, and Mimitsu Station.

Highways
National Route 10 runs straight through central Hyuga connecting it to most other major cities in western Kyushu. Route 15 is a very short stretch of highway connecting the industrial district with the Expressway. National Route 327 runs through the mountains connecting Hyuga with Misato, Morotsuka, and Shiiba.

The Higashikyushu Expressway is a tolled two-lane expressway linking most major cities in Kyushu. The Hyuga Interchange (IC) has become a major gateway in and out of Hyuga in part due to the dramatically reduced travel times to and from other cities.

Bus
The Miyazaki Kotsu serves Hyūga and nearby areas. It has local routes, as well as routes connecting to nearby Nobeoka (via Kadogawa Town), as well as routes from Hyūga to Misato Town and Shiba Village.

The Puratto Bus community bus service runs through central Hyūga.

The Hakko Liner express bus service connects Hyūga and northern Miyazaki with Fukuoka.

Shopping
 Aeon Town shopping mall

Friendship cities
 Weifang, Shandong Province, China (since February 25, 1986)

Notable people from Hyūga
 Norichika Aoki, Major League Baseball player
 Masatora Kawano, Japanese racewalking athlete

Education

High schools
 Hyūga High School
 Tomishima High School
 Hyūga Industrial High School

Junior high schools
 Iwawaki Junior High School
 Zaikōji Junior High School
 Daiodani Academy – Junior High School
 Hyūga Junior High School
 Mimitsu Junior High School
 Tomishima Junior High School
 Tōgō Junior High School

Elementary schools
 Shiomi Elementary School
 Saiwaki Elementary School
 Hososhima Elementary School
 Zaikōji Elementary School
 Zaikōji Minami Elementary School
 Daiodani Academy - Elementary School
 Hichiya Elementary School
 Hichiya Higashi Elementary School
 Mimitsu Elementary School
 Tomitaka Elementary School
 Hiraiwa Elementary School
 Tōgō Elementary School
 Tsuboya Elementary School

References

External links 

 
 
 Hyuga City Incorporated Tourism Association 

Cities in Miyazaki Prefecture
Port settlements in Japan
Populated coastal places in Japan